Minyomerus is a genus of broad-nosed weevils in the beetle family Curculionidae. There are about 17 described species in Minyomerus.

Species
These 17 species belong to the genus Minyomerus:

 Minyomerus aeriballux Jansen & Franz, 2015 c g
 Minyomerus bulbifrons Jansen & Franz, 2015 c g
 Minyomerus caseyi (Sharp, 1891) c g
 Minyomerus conicollis Green, 1920 i c g
 Minyomerus constrictus (Casey, 1888) i c g
 Minyomerus cracens Jansen & Franz, 2015 c g
 Minyomerus gravivultus Jansen & Franz, 2015 c g
 Minyomerus griseus (Sleeper, 1960) c g b
 Minyomerus innocuus Horn, 1876 i
 Minyomerus languidus Horn, 1876 i c g
 Minyomerus laticeps (Casey, 1888) i c g b
 Minyomerus microps (Say, 1831) i c g b
 Minyomerus politus Jansen & Franz, 2015 c g
 Minyomerus puticulatus Jansen & Franz, 2015 c g
 Minyomerus reburrus Jansen & Franz, 2015 c g
 Minyomerus rutellirostris Jansen & Franz, 2015 c g
 Minyomerus trisetosus Jansen & Franz, 2015 c g

Data sources: i = ITIS, c = Catalogue of Life, g = GBIF, b = Bugguide.net

References

Further reading

 
 
 
 
 

Entiminae
Articles created by Qbugbot